Timoci Uluivuda Bavadra (22 September 1934 – 3 November 1989) was a Fijian medical doctor who founded the Fiji Labour Party and served as the Prime Minister of Fiji for one month in 1987.

He was born in Viseisei, Viti Levu, and was medical doctor and politician by profession.

Contesting his first election in 1987, Bavadra forged an electoral coalition between his Labour Party and the much older, Indo-Fijian-dominated National Federation Party.  Although much larger, the NFP agreed to play a junior role in the coalition, aware that much of the ethnic Fijian community was not ready to accept an Indo-Fijian Prime Minister; even a government with a significant Indo-Fijian presence was itself bound to stretch the patience of ethnic Fijians.

The election was a stunning upset.  The Labour-NFP coalition captured 28 seats, four more than the Alliance Party, thereby ending the twenty-year reign of Ratu Sir Kamisese Mara, who, first as Chief Minister and subsequently as Prime Minister, had led Fiji since its pre-independence years.  Although an ethnic Fijian, Bavadra had been elected mostly with the support of Indo-Fijians.  Of the 28 members of his parliamentary caucus, only seven were ethnic Fijians, all of them elected from predominantly Indo-Fijian constituencies, a factor which caused considerable resentment among extremist sections of the Fijian population. Only nine percent of the ethnic Fijian electorate had voted for Bavadra's coalition, but even this was an unprecedented feat – a point that was largely overlooked.

Bavadra was opposed to nuclear testing and had hinted that visits by nuclear-armed warships of the United States Navy might not be welcome. Allegations have been made that the United States either supported or allowed Lieutenant-Colonel Sitiveni Rabuka to stage the coup on 13 May 1987 that brought down Bavadra's government, allegations that Rabuka has never convincingly denied. Unable to reverse the coup, Governor-General Ratu Sir Penaia Ganilau formally dismissed Bavadra on 19 May.  Bavadra made a tour of Commonwealth capitals, attempting to rally support, but got little more than sympathy.  In London in June, Queen Elizabeth, on advice of the Fijian Governor-General, refused to meet him.  After a period of negotiations, another coup, and a period of military rule, Ratu Mara again took office as Prime Minister on 5 December.

Bavadra died of cancer in 1989.

See also
Air New Zealand Flight 24

Notes

References

1934 births
1989 deaths
Deaths from cancer in Fiji
Prime Ministers of Fiji
Fiji Labour Party politicians
Leaders ousted by a coup
Fijian medical doctors
I-Taukei Fijian members of the House of Representatives (Fiji)
Politicians from Lautoka
20th-century physicians